Principales may refer to:

 In Philippine history, members of the Principalía
 In Roman history, certain military officers, see Auxilia#Junior officers (principales)